Vitya Glushakov - A Friend of the Apaches is a 1983 Soviet comedy film directed by Gerald Bezhanov.

Plot 
The film tells about the dreamer Vita, who writes a novel about the life of the Apaches and gets acquainted on the tram with the unemployed Arkady, whose life as a result made sense.

Cast 
 Leonid Kuravlyov
 Andrei Yuritsyn
 Ekaterina Semyonova
 Vladimir Lizunov
 Roman Dolgov
 Igor Yasulovich		
 Yevgeniya Sabelnikova	
 Galina Polskikh
 Mikhail Kokshenov
 Anna Varpakhovskaya

References

External links 
 

1983 films
1980s Russian-language films
Soviet comedy films
1983 comedy films